Acorda Therapeutics, Inc. is an American biotechnology company based in Pearl River, New York. The company develops therapies that improve neurological function in people with Parkinson's disease, multiple sclerosis and other neurological disorders. Acorda Therapeutics manufactures and markets the drugs Inbrija (levodopa inhalation powder) and Ampyra (dalfampridine) in the United States.

Products

Ampyra (dalfampridine)
Inbrija (levodopa inhalation powder)

Inbrija is administered by inhalation and is indicated for the intermittent treatment of off episodes in patients with Parkinson's disease currently taking carbidopa/levodopa. Inbrija is approved by the FDA and the EU.

Development pipeline 

 BTT1023 (timolumab) for primary sclerosing cholangitis (phase II)
CVT-427 (zolmitriptan) for the acute treatment of migraine (phase I)
rHIgM22, a remyelinating antibody for the treatment of multiple sclerosis (phase I)

ARCUS Technology 
Th ARCUS technology allows for the administration of drugs by inhalation. The FDA-approved drug Inbrija (levodopa inhalation powder) and the clinical-stage drug CVT-427 (zolmitriptan) currently use the ARCUS technology for drug delivery.

History and business model
Acorda Therapeutics was incorporated in 1995, founded by internist turned entrepreneur Ron Cohen in Hawthorne, New York.  Cohen had previously worked at the tissue engineering firm Advanced Tissue Sciences from 1986 to 1992.  Cohen's focus on neurology at Acorda was influenced by his father's being a neurologist at Columbia University Medical Center.  The business model of the company from the start was to work on commercialization of academic discoveries.  A single therapeutic area focus also has the advantage that physicians prescribing one drug might also prescribe another in Acorda's portfolio; for instance, the company planned to leverage physician access through tizanidine capsule sales to promote dalfampridine sales.

An initial public offering (IPO) in 2006 raised , about half of what was expected going into the offering, which was attributed to general weakness of the IPO market at the time.  These funds were supplemented by a private sale of shares later the same year, raising and additional .

As of 2007, twelve years after incorporation, the company had not yet turned a profit.

From 2019 to 2021 the company's earnings per share (EPS) increased by 4.5% every year. In 2021, the company's revenue was down by 13 percent.

Dalfampridine 
The Canadian Spinal Research Organization held the patent for this drug in 2002 when the organization engaged Acorda to conduct a Phase III trial for treatment of spasticity in patients with chronic spinal cord injury.  This was Acorda's flagship product and development of subsequent drug candidates was initially predicated on realized revenue from this drug's sales.  In November 2016, the company announced it was discontinuing development of the drug for post-stroke walking difficulties, after a clinical trial failure.  In the third quarter of 2019, the company's shares dropped by a significant 65.1% as a result of dalfampridine's multiple sclerosis indication facing competition in the United States.

Inbrija
In December 2018, the company announced the FDA approval of Inbrija (levodopa inhalation powder) for patients with Parkinson's disease. In January 2021, Acorda sold its manufacturing operations for Inbrija to Catalent for $70 million to reduce the company's operating expenses.

Tizanidine 
The company licensed tizanidine (Zanaflex) from Élan in the early 2000s to help meeting cash flow goals.  Acorda sells both capsule and tablet forms of this drug, with emphasis on the capsule form as this has patent protection through 2021, while the tablet form has many generic competitors.

Tozadenant 
This gave the company control over Biote's primary sclerosing cholangitis drug, BTT1023 and the oral adenosine A2A receptor antagonist tozadenant. In November 2017, the company announced discontinuation of research and development of the Phase III Parkinson's disease drug tozadenant. This followed the death of 5 patients enrolled in the tozadenant Phase III trial from agranulocytosis and associated severe adverse events possibly related to tozadenant.

Corporate governance
, the members of the board of directors of Acorda Therapeutics were: Ron Cohen, Barry Greene, Peder K. Jensen, John P. Kelley, Sandra Panem, Lorin J. Randall, Steven M. Rauscher, and Catherine D. Strader.

, the members of the senior management team were: Ron Cohen M.D. (Founder, president and chief executive officer), Burkhard Blank (chief medical officer), Andrew R. Blight (chief scientific officer emeritus), Denise Duca (executive vice president, human resources), Andrew A. Hidman (chief business officer), David Lawrence (chief, business operations and principal accounting officer), Lauren Sabella (chief commercial officer), Tierney Saccavino (executive vice president, corporate communications) and Jane Wasman (president, international and general counsel).

, founder, president and CEO Cohen would be about 63 years old.  Andrew Blight was the CSO in 2007 and  be about 68 years old, an emeritus in this role.  As of 2007, David Lawrence was the chief financial officer and Mary Fisher the chief operating officer.  Jane Wasman, about 62 in 2019, has held the general counsel role at the company since at least 2007.

References

External links

 
 Acorda Therapeutics Inc., The New York Times
 Acorda Therapeutics Inc., Hoover's

Companies listed on the Nasdaq
Biotechnology companies of the United States
Pharmaceutical companies of the United States
Biotechnology companies established in 1995
Companies based in Westchester County, New York
Life sciences industry
1995 establishments in New York (state)
Health care companies based in New York (state)